Frizzled-6 (Fz-6) is a protein that in humans is encoded by the FZD6 gene.

Members of the 'frizzled' gene family encode 7-transmembrane domain proteins that are receptors for WNT signaling proteins. The FZD6 protein contains a signal peptide, a cysteine-rich domain in the N-terminal extracellular region, and 7 transmembrane domains. However, unlike many other FZD family members, FDZ6 does not contain a C-terminal PDZ domain-binding motif. Fz-6 is believed to be the receptor for the WNT4 ligand.

Interactions 

Fz-6 has been shown to interact with secreted frizzled-related protein 1.

Model organisms
Model organisms have been used in the study of FXYD3 function. In 2004, researchers at the Howard Hughes Medical Institute showed that FZD6 controls hair patterning in mice, and its human homologue is understood to play a part in the formation of hair whorls and cowlicks. A conditional knockout mouse line called Fxyd3tm1a(KOMP)Wtsi was generated at the Wellcome Trust Sanger Institute. Male and female animals underwent a standardized phenotypic screen to determine the effects of deletion. Additional screens performed:  - In-depth immunological phenotyping

References

Further reading

External links 
 

G protein-coupled receptors